Edward F. Crawford (January 1, 1919 – September 25, 1975) was an American lawyer and politician from upstate New York.

Biography
Crawford was born on January 1, 1919, in Oswego, New York, the son of Edward F. Crawford and Mary Farley Crawford. He graduated B.A. from St. Michael's College, Toronto, in 1941, and LL.B. from Fordham Law School in 1945. He was admitted to the bar the same year, practiced law in Oswego, and entered politics as a Republican. He married Margaret M. Conlin, and they had two children.

Crawford was Oswego County Attorney from 1951 to 1956. He was a member of the New York State Assembly from 1957 to 1973, sitting in the 171st, 172nd, 173rd, 174th, 175th, 176th, 177th, 178th, 179th and 180th New York State Legislatures. He was a delegate to the New York State Constitutional Convention of 1967. In November 1973, he was elected to the New York Supreme Court (5th D.).

Crawford died on September 25, 1975, in Crouse Irving Memorial Hospital in Syracuse, New York, of cancer.

References

1919 births
1975 deaths
Politicians from Oswego, New York
Republican Party members of the New York State Assembly
New York Supreme Court Justices
University of St. Michael's College alumni
Fordham University School of Law alumni
20th-century American judges
20th-century American politicians
American expatriates in Canada